Jean-Louis Gagnon, OC, CQ, FRSC (February 21, 1913 – May 26, 2004) was a Canadian journalist, writer, and public servant. He was a member of the Royal Commission on Bilingualism and Biculturalism and, following the death of André Laurendeau, its co-president.

Gagnon was appointed Director General of Information Canada in 1970, served as Ambassador and Permanent Delegate of Canada to UNESCO from 1972 to 1976, and member of the Canadian Radio-television and Telecommunications Commission from 1976 to 1983.

References 

 https://www.thecanadianencyclopedia.ca/en/article/jean-louis-gagnon
 https://www.gg.ca/en/honours/recipients/146-14659

Journalists from Quebec
2004 deaths
Officers of the Order of Canada
Knights of the National Order of Quebec
Fellows of the Royal Society of Canada
Canadian diplomats
Canadian Radio-television and Telecommunications Commission
Canadian newspaper editors
University of Ottawa alumni
Canadian radio journalists